Lindome GIF is a Swedish football club located in Lindome in Mölndal Municipality, Västra Götaland County.

Background
The club was formed on 31 January 1928 under the name Lindome IF through the merger of Lindome JUF, Anderstorps IF and Stationens IF. In 1960 the name was changed to Lindome GoIF (Lindome gymnastik och idrottsförening).

The original club members were farmers and youth members of the Jordbrukarungdomens Förbund (Farmers' Youth League) and the motive was simply that by engaging in sport, members could have fun together.  Sports that the club engaged in included football but also table tennis, bandy, boxing, swimming and athletics.

Since their foundation Lindome GIF has participated mainly in the middle and lower divisions of the Swedish football league system.  However, in 2007 the club won Division 2 Västra Götaland and were promoted to Division 1 Södra where they spent two seasons. The club currently plays in Division 2 Västra Götaland which is the fourth tier of Swedish football. They play their home matches at the Lindevi IP in Lindome.

Lindome GIF are affiliated to the Göteborgs Fotbollförbund.

Season to season

Attendances

In recent seasons Lindome GIF have had the following average attendances:

Footnotes

External links
 Lindome GIF – Official website

Football clubs in Gothenburg
Association football clubs established in 1928
Bandy clubs established in 1928
1928 establishments in Sweden
Defunct bandy clubs in Sweden
Football clubs in Västra Götaland County